Pinsky Uyezd was one of the counties of Minsk Governorate and the Governorate-General of Minsk of the Russian Empire and then of Byelorussian Soviet Socialist Republic with its center in Pinsk from 1793 until its formal abolition in 1924 by Soviet authorities.

Demographics
At the time of the Russian Empire Census of 1897, Pinsky Uyezd had a population of 230,763. Of these, 74.3% spoke Belarusian, 19.5% Yiddish, 2.6% Polish, 2.6% Russian, 0.6% Ukrainian and 0.2% German as their native language.

References

 
Uezds of Minsk Governorate
Minsk Governorate